The V. D. Radio Project was a public health campaign created by the United States Public Health Service in 1949 to combat syphilis.

In 1949, taking advantage of the recently developed treatments of the sexually transmitted disease involving penicillin, the United States Public Health Service enlisted the help of radio veteran and Columbia University professor Erik Barnouw to create a series of radio programs intended to raise awareness and to influence the millions of men and women suffering from the disease to seek help. Targeting the rural south and industrial north, the V. D. Radio Project created a variety of programming, including public service announcements from various entertainers and politicians, interviews with patients and doctors, soap operas, and what they called "ballad dramas" or "hillbilly operas". The ballad dramas were the brainchild of folklorist Alan Lomax, who enlisted country, folk, and gospel superstars to perform their music in dramatic programs tailor-made for their talents and personae. Performers in the ballad dramas included Woody Guthrie, Sister Rosetta Tharpe, Hank Williams, Roy Acuff, and Merle Travis, among others.

Further reading
Barnouw, Erik. Media Marathon, Duke University Press, 1996 (an autobiography).

External links
The V. D. Radio Project at The WNYC Archives
VD on the Radio from Studio 360
Venereal Disease and Country Music blog piece from The University of Missouri-Kansas City Marr Sound Archives

Health campaigns
American talk radio programs
1940s American radio programs